Bulacan, officially the Province of Bulacan, is a province in the Philippines located in the Central Luzon region. Its capital is the city of Malolos. Bulacan was established on August 15, 1578, and part of the Metro Luzon Urban Beltway Super Region.

It has 569 barangays in 20 municipalities and four component cities (Baliwag, Malolos the provincial capital, Meycauayan, and San Jose del Monte). Bulacan is located immediately north of Metro Manila. Bordering Bulacan are the provinces of Pampanga to the west, Nueva Ecija to the north, Aurora and Quezon to the east, and Metro Manila and Rizal to the south. Bulacan also lies on the north-eastern shore of Manila Bay.

In the 2020 census, Bulacan had a population of 3,708,890 people, the most populous in Central Luzon and the third most populous in the Philippines, after Cebu and Cavite. Bulacan's most populated city is San Jose del Monte, the most populated municipality is Santa Maria while the least populated is Doña Remedios Trinidad.

In 1899, the historic Barasoain Church in Malolos was the birthplace of the first constitutional democracy in Asia.

On November 7, 2018, the Provincial Government of Bulacan bagged its fourth Seal of Good Local Governance award. The SGLG award is a progressive assessment system that gives distinction to remarkable governance performance.

This province is a part of Greater Manila Area.

History

Spanish Colonial Era
The Conquest of Bulacan traces to the first years of the Spanish in the Philippines. Upon the defeat of the Macabebe and Hagonoy natives led by Bambalito in the Battle of Bangkusay on June 3, 1571, that caused Martín de Goiti to move north, first to Lubao in September 1571.

Two months later, on November 14, 1571, Goiti reached Malolos and Calumpit respectively and it was reported to Adelantado Miguel Lopez de Legaspi, the first Governor-General of the Philippines. Adelantado established Calumpit and Malolos as an Encomienda entrusted to Sargento Juan Moron (Morones in other documents) and Don Marcos de Herrera. These two conquistadores were one of the first group of conquerors accompanied by Legaspi who have arrived in the Islands in 1565.

On April 5, 1572, the Encomiendas of Calumpit and Malolos were unified co-administered by Moron and Herrera. Also on that year, Alcaldia de Calumpit was formed in which the areas of Macabebe, Candaba, Apalit in Pampanga, and the settlements of Meyto, Panducot, Meysulao, and Malolos. On December 28, 1575, Governor-General Francisco Sande order to include Hagonoy in Calumpit.

In 1575, Bulakan was established as a visita of Tondo, and it is not part of Calumpit as the boundary between Tondo and Calumpit was marked in Mambog River and placed the statue of Our Lady of Visitacion (patroness of Calumpit) was erected. It was gone and recreated in 1997 upon the re-establishment of the Roman Catholic Parish of Our Lady of Presentacion in Malolos.

On April 30, 1578, Bulakan town was officially established by the Augustinians with Fray Diego Vivar as its first prior and the convent was dedicated to San Agustin when it was changed to Our Lady of Assumption was uncertain. It was reported that the western part of the present-day Bulacan was to be very well populated and rich. No exact date and year when Alcaldia de Calumpit was dissolved and the exact foundation year of the Province of Bulacan. It was only documented that Malolos (then part of Calumpit in 1572) was first to appear as part of Alcaldia de Bulacan was in 1582. It may be assumed that the reorganization of encomiendas has occurred between 1580 and 1582 at the time of Governor-General Gonzalo Ronquillo de Penalosa.

Same document also from the 1582 Relacion de las Islas Filipinas by Miguel de Loarca reports that Alcaldia de Calumpit have the jurisdiction in the areas of Calumpit (capital) Capalangan, Cabangbangan and Hagonoy as its villages. Then Loarca was mentioned that Alcaldia de Bulacan have Bulakan (capital) Malolos, Caluya, Guguinto, Binto and Catanghalan (instead of Meycauayan) as its encomiendas which formerly have one alcalde (mayor) but he said that Alcaldia de Bulacan was formed in 1580 at the time of Penalosa.

In the document of Governor-General Luis Perez de Dasmarinas in the Account of the Encomiendas for the King of Spain furnished on June 21, 1591. Dasmarinas mentioned that Alcaldia of Bulacan was part of La Pampanga with the Encomiendas subject to it such as the Encomiendas of Malolos (3,600 persons), Binto (2,000 persons), Guiguinto (2,000 persons), Caluya (2,800 persons), Mecabayan (2, 800 persons) and Bulacan identified as " capital" and residence of "alcalde mayor" with 4,800 persons. In the same 1591 document, it was mentioned that Calumpit y Hagonoy belongs to Juan Moron with the 12,800 persons, 2 Augustinian Convents, and 1 Alcalde Mayor of its own.

However, the establishment and development of the southern part of the present-day Bulacan was not simultaneous and identified with the West. In 1578, the Order of Friars Minor, headed by Juan de Plasencia and Diego Oropesa, arrived in the area called Toril (now part of Meycauayan) and their headquarters. Also in 1578, Plasencia established the Town of Meycauayan. Its pueblos were first only settlements of the Old Meycauayan, founded by Franciscan

The province of Bulacan is on the island of Luzon, and is one of the most important Alcadia de Termino, Civil and politically it corresponds to the Audiencia y capitanía general de Filipinas, and spiritually belongs to the Archbishop of Manila. Franciscan friars Juan Plasencia and Fray Diego de Oropesa founded Meycauayan in 1578, and for a time it was the capital of the Province of Meycauayan (differ from the Western Bulacan administered by Augustinian Order since 1572) Meycauayan people were able to flourish and became so rich that the sons are six of the best in the then Province of Meycauayan. It was the towns of Bocaue, Polo, San Jose del Monte, Santa Maria de Pandi, Obando and Marilao).

During the General Visitation of October 5, 1762, by Don Simón de Anda y Salazar, the province was headed by Capitan Don Jose Pasarin, alcalde mayor of the province. 1795–96, Don Manuel Piñon was the alcalde mayor.

According to the "Guia de 1839", Bulacan province in the island of Luzon, Philippines, is governed by a mayor, consists of 19 pueblos, 36,394 tributes and 181,970 souls. D. Felipe Gobantes, Alcalde of the province of Bulacan erected a stone column in the plaza of Bulacan in Memory of Fr. Manuel Blanco O.S.A. who died on April 1, 1845.

In 1848, when the boundaries of Pampanga were changed, the region, which includes the important town of San Miguel de Mayumo and neighboring places that were formerly part of Pampanga, was adjudicated to Bulacan.

The Philippine Revolution 

In an earlier period during 1890, Malolos was a hot spot of Liberal Ilustrados, notably the "20 Women of Malolos", who exerted pressure for education under a Filipino professor. However, the first phase of the revolution ceased in 1897 with the signing of the Pact of Biak-na-Bato in San Miguel. Under its terms, the leaders were to go to Hong Kong and reside there. Under the illusory peace created by the pact, the end of 1897 saw the greater determination on the part of the Filipinos to carry on the revolution.

In early 1898, the provinces of Zambales, Ilocos, Pampanga, Bulacan, Laguna, Pangasinan, Nueva Ecija, Tarlac, and Camarines rose again. In Central Luzon, a revolutionary government was organized under General Francisco Macabulos, a Kapampangan revolutionary leader of La Paz, Tarlac.

American Colonial era 
The Americans established a local Philippine government in the Philippines when they held the first municipal election in the country in the city of Baliwag on May 6, 1899. At the beginning of the American rule, 1899–1900, Malolos became the headquarters of the Military Governor of the Philippines at Casa Real. On February 27, 1901, the Philippine Commission officially transferred the seat of government to Malolos, and the Casa Real de Malolos was the seat of the Provincial Governor from 1900 to 1930 until the completion of the capitol building at Barangay Guinhawa, Malolos City.

World War II 
In 1942, at the height of World War II, the Japanese Imperial Army occupied Bulacan and made Casa Real de Malolos its headquarters. In 1945, combined Filipino and American forces and local guerrillas attacked the Japanese Imperial Forces and liberated Bulacan.

Postwar Era 
After the war, Bulacan was embroiled in the rebellion of Hukbalahap Guerrillas.

In February 1945, Huk Squadron 77 composed of 109 veteran guerillas was surrounded, shot, and buried in a mass grave in Malolos, Bulacan.

Martial Law Era 
Agrarian unrest in the province continued well after the Huk Rebellion. On June 21, 1982, a group of young activists opposing the Marcos dictatorship tried to help farmers form a local chapter of Alyansa ng Magbubukid sa Gitnang Luzon (AMLG). They were arrested by armed soldiers from the 175th Philippine Constabulary Company and were found dead the following day in San Rafael, Bulacan. The name of the so-called Bulacan Martyrs was added to the Bantayog ng mga Bayani's ‘Wall of Remembrance’ in 2012.

Through Presidential Decree № 824, Bulacan was partitioned on November 7, 1975, to form the National Capital Region. The municipality of Valenzuela was excised to form the new region, while the other 25 towns remained in Bulacan.

Issues concerning the foundation date
To determine the tentative date of Bulacan's foundation and to trace its roots from colonial period. Efforts and research conducted by Jaime Veneracion, Reynaldo Naguit of the Center for Bulacan Studies, and Isagani Giron of the Samahang Pangkasaysayan ng Bulacan (Sampaka) shows that Bulacan was identified as a visita of Tondo in 1578.

With regards to exact date of foundation of Bulacan as a province, Veneracion correlated it with the practice of Spaniard of dedicating the founding a pueblo to the feast of a patron saint. In the case of Bulacan it is the Nuestra Señora de la Asuncion, which is also the patron saint of Bulakan town, the first capital of the province. Officially, the province of Bulacan was created under Act 2711 on March 10, 1917.

Geography
Bulacan covers a total area of  occupying the southeastern section of the Central Luzon region. The province is bounded by Nueva Ecija (San Isidro Gapan, General Tinio) on the north, Aurora (Dingalan) on the northeast, Quezon (General Nakar) on the east, Rizal (Rodriguez) on the southeast, Metro Manila (Valenzuela City, Malabon, Navotas, Caloocan and Quezon City) on the south, Manila Bay on the southwest, and Pampanga (Candaba, San Luis, Pampanga, Apalit, Macabebe, Masantol) on the west.

Several rivers irrigate the province of Bulacan; the largest one is that of Angat. Angat River passes through the towns of Norzagaray, Angat, Bustos, San Rafael, Baliwag, Plaridel, Pulilan, and Calumpit. It flows thence into the Pampanga River, goes out again, washes Hagonoy, and loses itself in the mangroves. The banks of these rivers are very fertile and are covered with trees.

Terrain
Bulacan lies in the southern portion of the fertile plains of Central Luzon. The area is drained by the Angat and Pampanga rivers. The Sierra Madre mountain range forms the highlands of Bulacan in the east and is a protected area known as the Angat Watershed Forest Reserve. Angat Lake, which was formed by the Angat Dam is located in that area. The highest point in the province at 1,206 meters is Mount Oriod, part of the Sierra Madre.

On January 19, 2008, an  dump site, a new landfill that would also be a tourist attraction opened in Norzagaray, Bulacan province. Ramon Angelo, Jr., president Waste Custodian Management Corp. stated: "I want them to see our system in our place which should not be abhorred because we are using the new state-of-the-art technology."

Climate
November to April is generally dry while wet for the rest of the year. The northeast monsoon (amihan) prevails from October to January bringing in moderated and light rains. From February to April, the east trade winds predominate but the Sierra Madre (Philippines) mountain range to the east disrupts the winds resulting to a dry period. From May to September, the southwest monsoon (habagat).

Administrative divisions
Bulacan is subdivided into 20 municipalities and 4 cities.  As the population is concentrated in the southern half of the province, so are the legislative districts.

Demographics

The population of Bulacan in the 2020 census was 3,708,890 people, making it the second most populous province in the country, only behind from Cavite, which is also located in Luzon.

On May 1, 2010, the province had 2,924,433 inhabitants with an annual population growth rate of 2.73 from the year 2000 to 2010, There were 588,693 households in the province with an average size of 4.8 persons. Bulacan had a median age of 23 years in 2007.

Languages and ethnicities
As it is part of the Tagalog cultural sphere (Katagalugan), Tagalog is the predominant language of Bulacan. The Tagalog dialect spoken in Bulacan resembles a poetic form of speech. Some inhabitants also speak Kapampangan, especially in areas close to the border of Pampanga. Three municipalities (San Miguel, Remedios Trinidad, and Norzagaray) and one city (San Jose del Monte) are the homelands of the Alta Kabulowan, the first inhabitants of Bulacan, whose language is also called Alta Kabulowan. Their language is currently endangered due to an influx of Tagalog speakers.

San Jose del Monte City, Santa Maria, Malolos, Marilao, San Miguel and Norzagaray bear the highest number of English speakers in the province.

Religion
Roman Catholic (89.44%) is the predominant religion in the province. Malolos City is the seat of the Roman Catholic Diocese of Malolos, with its mother church, the Minor Basilica and Cathedral of the Immaculate Conception. On March 21, 2021, Sta. Maria Church was also granted the status of Minor Basilica by Pope Francis. It became Bulacan's second Minor Basilica and the 18th in the Philippines.

Other Christian groups include the Iglesia ni Cristo (3.29%), Evangelicals (1.53%), Jehovah's Witnesses (0.37%), Bible Baptist Church (0.30%), Muslims (0.21%), Seventh-day Adventist (0.21%), Aglipayans (0.17%)  and other small number of Christians and non-Christian groups are also present.

Economy

Industries
The province of Bulacan is steadily becoming industrialized due to its proximity to Metro Manila. Many corporations put up industrial plants and site in Bulacan. Some of the businesses and industries include agribusiness; aquaculture; banking; cement bag making; ceramics; construction; courier; education; food/food processing; furniture; garments; gifts, houseware & decors; hospitals; hotels, resorts and restaurants; information and communications technology; insurance; jewelry; leather and leather tanning; manpower; manufacturing; marble; printing press; pyrotechnics and fireworks manufacturing; realty/real property development; shoe manufacturing; textile; trade; transport services; travel and tours.

Agribusiness and aquaculture
The rural areas still mostly depend on agriculture and aquaculture as a source of income. Some of the major crops are rice, corn, vegetables, and fruits such as mangoes. An orchid farm is operating at Golden Bloom Orchids at Barangay Maguinao in San Rafael, Bulacan. The fisheries of Bulacan, aside from fishponds and rivers, include Bustos Dam and waterlogged areas. Major species cultured include bangus, tilapia, prawn, and catfish. This made Bulacan a leading province in Bangus (milkfish) production based on reports of the Bureau of Agricultural Statistics (BAS).

Banking and finance
Bulacan is served by all major banks with more than 200 banks doing business in the province. The entrepreneurial culture is supported by the strong cooperative movement with total assets of over PhP 2 Billion.

Industrial estate and parks
This is a partial list of industrial sites in the province:

 First Bulacan Industrial City—Malolos City
 Intercity Industrial Estate—Wakas, Bocaue
 Bulacan Agro-Industrial Subdivision—Calumpit
 Bulacan Metro Warehouse (BMW) Center—Guiguinto
 Horizon IT Park—San Jose del Monte
 Meycauayan Industrial Subd. I, II, III & IV—Meycauayan
 Meridian Industrial Compound—Meycauayan
 Muralla Industrial Project—Meycauayan
 First Valenzuela Industrial Compound—Meycauayan
 Sterling Industrial Park Phase I, II, III & IV—Meycauayan
 Grand Industrial Estate—Plaridel
 Sapang Palay Industrial Estates—San Jose del Monte
 Agus Development Corporation—Santa María
 Bulacan ICT Park—Marilao
 Golden City Business Park—Wakas, Bocaue
 Sterling Industrial Park—Marilao

Income
Bulacan received the top place for "LGU's with Highest Gross Income" (PhP 1,717,600,000.00) and "Top Spender by LGU's" (PhP 1,349,420,000.00), and third (3rd) among the "Top Provinces with Generated Biggest Net Income" (PhP 368,180,000.00) according to the 2006 Annual Financial Report - Local Governments of the Commission of Audit. The first time to top the perennial top placer, which was the Province of Cebu.

The province received the top place for "LGU's with Highest Gross Income" (PHP 1,807,600,000.00), second (2nd) in "Top Spender by LGU's" (PHP 1,372,160,000.00), and third (3rd) among the "Top Provinces with Generated Biggest Net Income" (PHP 434,830,000.00) according to the 2007 Annual Financial Report - Local Governments of the Commission of Audit.

Based on the Commission of Audit's 2008 Annual Financial Report for Local Governments, the province's total gross income had increased to PhP 1,965,633,000.00 (including the subsidies and extra items). Its expenses had also increased to PHP 1,641,325,000.00, which brings a total net income of PHP 324,308,000.00.

This is the list of the top income earners in Bulacan from 2014 and 2017:

Local Products

"Tatak Bulakenyo Program" was launched in 2004, conceptualized to stimulate economic activity in the province and sustain the anti-poverty thrust of the government through the promotion of entrepreneurship. The program's beneficiaries are potential micro, small and medium-sized enterprises in the province.

Tatak Bulakenyo Products comprises sabutan bags, buntal hats, beverages, and even jams such as tomato jam.

Inipit
Lengua de gato
Minasa
Pandesal de Baliwag
Polvoron de Pinipig
Bibingkang kamoteng kahoy
Pinipig de leche
Garbanzos
Fish and kinds of seafood
Bagoong Alamang
Sausage Relyeno
Tahong chips
Honey bee products
Tomato jam
Chicharon
Longganisa
Mushroom meat products
Bulacan's Prime Garlic Longaniza
Ortega's Best
Atsarang dampalit
Atsarang Indian mango
Atsarang kangkong
Atsarang papaya
Lechon sarsa
Pickled fish
Pickled jerkins
Pickled vegetables
Sukang Paombong
TET sarsa
Tuba ng sasa

Transportation 

Bulacan is dubbed as "The Gateway to the Northern Philippines". The province is linked with Metro Manila primarily through the North Luzon Expressway and Manila North Road (better known as the MacArthur Highway) which crosses the province into Pampanga and western part of Northern Luzon (western Central Luzon, Ilocos and Cordillera Administrative Region). While taking the Cagayan Valley Road in Guiguinto, the road leads to Nueva Ecija and to the eastern part of Northern Luzon (eastern Central Luzon and Cagayan Valley Region). Bulacan will be accessed by the future C-6 Road connecting the provinces of Rizal and Cavite and the cities of Taguig, Parañaque and Muntinlupa in Metro Manila.

The proposed North Luzon East Expressway (NLEE) is the future expressway link between Metro Manila and the provinces of Bulacan and Nueva Ecija. It will also serve as a new alternate route of motorists coming from Manila going to Aurora and Cagayan Valley region.

The MacArthur Highway traverses the province from north to south. Most major towns can be reached through the North Luzon Expressway. A good number of motor vehicles owned largely by private individuals provide mobility to Bulacan's populace. Aside from five main highways that traverse the province, all roads are widely dispersed throughout Bulacan.

Bus terminals of Baliwag Transit Inc., Golden Bee Transport and Logistics Corp., California Bus Line, Sampaguita Liner, and Royal Eagle are in Baliwag, Balagtas and Hagonoy. The main bus lines of Philippine Rabbit, Victory Liner, Aladdin Transit that originates from their main terminals in Manila, Pasay and Quezon City and travels northward to cities and towns in Pampanga, Tarlac, and Zambales, pass through Bulacan via the Tabang exit. Other bus companies that travel to Bulacan include ES Transport Corp. (Earth Star Transportation), Baliwag Transit, First North Luzon, Five Star, Agila Bus Transport, Sta Monica Transport Corp TSC, NSDC Buenasher Lines (Del Carmen), Shannen And Pauline Bus Co., Phil. Corinthian, Marsan, Mayamy, RJ Express. Bulacan is the home of its pride, one of the biggest bus lines in Luzon, the Baliwag Transit Inc. which headquarters in Baliwag, Bulacan hence it's named.

Public transportation within the province, like in most of the urban areas in the Philippines, is facilitated mostly using inexpensive jeepneys and buses. Tricycles are used for short distances.

A construction of Philippine National Railways (PNR) North-South Commuter Railway (NSCR) system is on track, and officials say the remnants of old PNR stations built in Bulacan province in 1892 will be preserved. The ruins of the station in Guiguinto town, Bulacan province, will be among the structures that will be preserved. The structures in the city and in the towns of Balagtas, Guiguinto, Malolos, and Calumpit would also be renovated to complement the design of the new railway stations.

Junn Magno, PNR general manager, said 10 structures left standing from the old stations would be restored to give a glimpse of the PNR's history.

The San Miguel Corporation’s proposed Bulacan Airport, dubbed as the New Manila International Airport, involves the construction of a brand-new international airport and is being positioned as an alternative to the congested NAIA in Manila. It has also been seen that the four million tourists that visit the country yearly will be tripled once the airport project proposal pushes through.

Education

The province is home to several nationally recognized public and private educational institutions such as Baliuag University (First school granted full autonomy in Region 3), the Bulacan State University (Main & Satellite Campuses), the Bulacan Polytechnic College (Malolos, Bocaue, Pandi, Angat, San Miguel, San Rafael, Obando & City of San Jose del Monte Campus), Bulacan Agricultural State College (San Ildefonso & DRT Campus), Polytechnic University of the Philippines (Santa Maria Extension Campus and Pulilan Campus), La Consolacion University Philippines and Centro Escolar University (Malolos Campus). On the other hand, National University, a non-sectarian Manila-based university, has established its first campus outside Metro Manila in the city of Baliwag, and Baliuag Polytechnic College, a public non-sectarian institution in the city of Baliwag.

Primary and intermediate

There are currently four (4) schools divisions under the Department of Education:
 Bulacan (Province)
 City of Malolos
 City of San Jose del Monte
 City of Meycauayan

Bulacan has 475 public Elementary schools, 383 public schools under the Department of Education (DepEd) Division of Bulacan, 52 public schools under the Division of City Schools of San Jose del Monte and 38 public schools under the Division of City Schools of Malolos.

Secondary

Bulacan has 68 public high schools, national and provincial. Forty-three under the Department of Education (DepEd) Division of Bulacan, Eighteen public high schools under the Division of City Schools of San Jose del Monte, three public high schools under the Division of City Schools of Malolos and Division of City Schools of Meycauayan has four public high schools.

Private schools

There are numerous privately owned (by individual or group) and church-operated schools located in the province.

The Immaculate Conception School for Boys and the Immaculate Conception School of Malolos are both under the Diocese of Malolos, with the incumbent Bishop of Malolos as president. Also under the Diocese is the Immaculate Conception Seminary. Others are under the direction of religious orders and congregations such as the La Consolacion University Philippines (Augustinian Sisters of Our Lady of Consolation), the St. Martin de Porres Catholic School (Dominican Sisters), St. Paul College of Bocaue and St. Paul University at San Miguel (Congregation of the Sisters of St. Paul of Chartres) and the Holy Spirit Academy of Malolos (Sister Servants of the Holy Spirit). The Immaculate Heart of Mary School was established in 1992 with student enrollment less than 200 (as of 2016–17).

There are also schools under other denominations such as the Bulacan Ecumenical School and Bulacan Ecumenical Kindergarted (United Methodist Church).

Private schools in the province are members of the Bulacan Private Schools Association (BULPRISA) While in the City of San Jose del Monte private schools are organized by City of San Jose del Monte Private Schools Association (CSanPRISA). In Malolos, private schools are organized as Malolos City Private Schools Association (MACIPRISA). In Meycauayan, private schools are organized as Meycauayan City Private Schools Association (MEYCIPRISA). In Marilao, private schools are organized as Association of Private Schools in Marilao (APRISM).

Government

Current provincial government officials (2022–2025):
Governor: Daniel R. Fernando (NUP)
Vice Governor: Alexis C. Castro (NUP)

Provincial Board Members:

First District
Allan P. Andan (PDP–Laban)
Romina D. Fermin (PDP-Laban)
Second District
Atty. Erlene Luz V. Dela Cruz (NUP)
Lee Edward V. Nicolas (PDP-Laban)
Third District
Romeo V. Castro, Jr. (NUP)
Raul A. Mariano (NUP)

Fourth District
Enrique A. Delos Santos, Jr. (PDP–Laban)
Allen Dale D. Baluyut (NUP)
Fifth District
Richard A. Roque (NUP)
Cezar L. Mendoza (NUP)
Sixth District
Renato D. De Guzman, Jr. (PDP-Laban)
Arthur A. Legaspi (PDP-Laban)

Ex-officio Board Members:
PCL President
 William R. Villarica
ABC President
 Ramilito B. Capistrano
SK President
 Robert Myron G. Nicolas

Congressional District Representatives:
 First District:  Atty. Danilo A. Domingo (NUP)
 Second District: Augustina Dominique C. Pancho (NUP)
 Third District: Lorna C. Silverio (NUP)
 Fourth District: Linabelle Ruth R. Villarica (PDP–Laban)
 Fifth District: Ambrosio C. Cruz, Jr. (Lakas-CMD)
 Sixth District: Salvador A. Pleyto, Sr. (Lakas-CMD)
 Lone District of San Jose del Monte: Florida P. Robes (PDP-Laban)

Official seal

Points of interest

Festivals
Source:

Minasa Festival: Bustos (2nd Week of January)
Halamaman Festival: Guiguinto (3rd Week of January)
Bulak Festival: San Ildefonso (Every January)
Fiesta Republica: City of Malolos (Every January)
Santo Niño Festival: City of Malolos (Last Sunday of January)
Obrero Festival: City of San Jose Del Monte (February 22)
Chicharon Festival: Santa Maria (Month of February)
Balagtasan Festival: Balagtas (April 2)
Flagellants and Lenten Rites: Paombong (Good Friday)
Lenten Procession: Baliwag (Good Friday)
Barong at Saya Festival: Pandi (April 17)
Halamang Dilaw Festival: Marilao (April 21 – May 8)
Kneeling Carabao Festival: Pulilan (May 14–15)
Obando Fertility Dance: Obando (May 17–19)
Buntal Festival: Baliwag (Month of May)
Flores de Maria: Bulakan (Last Saturday of May)
Libad Festival: Calumpit (June 23–24)
Pagoda Festival: Bocaue (Sunday After July 2)
Palaisdaan Festival: Hagonoy (July 25–26)
Casay Festival: Norzagaray (August 13)
Tanglawan Festival: City of San Jose Del Monte (September 3–10)
Singkaban Festival: Province of Bulacan (September 8–15)
Mayumo Festival: San Miguel (September 28–29)
Angel Festival: San Rafael (September 29)
Suguran Festival: City of Meycauayan (October 4)
Catorse de Noviembre Festival: Bulakan (November 14)
Sayaw Sta. Isabel: City of Malolos (Sunday before November 17)
Salubong Festival: Plaridel (December 29–30)

Religious
Source:

Sta. Monica Parish in Angat
St. Lawrence, Deacon and Martir Parish in Balagtas
Parish of Augustine in Baliwag
St. Martin of Tours Parish and Diocesan Shrine of Mahal na Poong Krus sa Wawa in Bocaue
Shrine of Saint Andrew Kim Tae-gon in Bocaue
Nuestra Señora de la Asuncion Parish in Bulakan	
Sto. Niño Parish in Bustos	
Diocesan Shrine and Parish of St. John the Baptist in Calumpit
Nuestra Señora de Lourdes Parish in Doña Remedios Trinidad
St. Ildephonse of Toledo Parish in Guiguinto
National Shrine and Parish of Saint Anne in Hagonoy	
Immaculate Conception Parish - Cathedral and Minor Basilica in City of Malolos
Our Lady of Mt. Carmel Parish - Barasoain Church in City of Malolos
St. Elizabeth of Hungary Parish in City of Malolos
St. Michael the Archangel Parish in Marilao
Parish and National Shrine of the Divine Mercy in Marilao
Parish of Saint Francis of Assisi in City of Meycauayan
St. Andrew the Apostle Parish in Norzagaray
San Pascual Baylon Parish and National Shrine of Nuestra Señora, Inmaculada Concepcion de Salambao in Obando
Immaculate Conception Parish in Pandi
Santiago Apostol Parish in Paombong
St. James the Apostle Parish in Plaridel
San Isidro Labrador Parish in Pulilan
San Ildefonso Parish in San Ildefonso
St. Joseph the Worker Parish in City of San Jose Del Monte
Grotto of Our Lady of Lourdes in City of San Jose Del Monte
San Miguel Arcangel Parish in San Miguel
Parish of Saint John of God in San Rafael
Diocesan Shrine and Parish of Sagrado Corazon de Jesus in San Rafael
La Purisima Concepcion Parish in Santa Maria
Diocesan Shrine and Quasi-Parish of Mary Mother of the Eucharist and Grace in Santa Maria
San Isidro Labrador Parish in Bustos

Historical
Source:

Enriquez Ancestral House in Bulacan
Meyto Shrine in Calumpit
St. John the Baptist Church in Calumpit
Basilica Minore de Immaculada Concepcion in City of Malolos
Kakarong de Sili Shrine in Pandi
Battle of Quingua Monument in Plaridel
Tecson House in San Miguel
Marcelo H. del Pilar Shrine in Bulacan
Bulacan Museum in City of Malolos
Old Train Station in Guiguinto
Biak-na-Bato National Park in San Miguel
Baliwag Museum in City of Baliwag
Barasoain Ecclesiastical Museum in City of Malolos
Pinagrealan Cave in Norzagaray
Bagbag Bridge in Calumpit
Mercado House in Bustos
Casa Real Shrine in City of Malolos
Barasoain Church in City of Malolos

Heritages
Source:

Baliwag Clock Tower in Baliwag
Enriquez Ancestral House in Bulacan
Meyto Shrine in Calumpit
Battle of Quingua Monument in Plaridel
Simborio Chapel in Plaridel
Tecson House in San Miguel
Marcelo H. del Pilar Shrine in Bulacan
Emilio Aguinaldo Bridge in City of San Jose del Monte
Hiyas Bulacan Museum in City of Malolos
Old Train Station in Guiguinto
Francisco Balagtas Museum/Marker Birth Place in Balagtas
Francisca Reyes Aquino Shrine in Bocaue
Baliwag Museum in Baliwag
Barasoain Ecclesiastical Museum in City of Malolos
Bautista Mansion in City of Malolos
Bagbag Bridge in Calumpit
Mercado House in Bustos
Casa Real Shrine in City of Malolos
Barasoain Church in City of Malolos	
Museo San Ysidro de Pulilan in Pulilan

Ecological
Source:

Calumpit River in Calumpit
Verdivia Falls in Doña Remedios Trinidad	
Pulilan Butterfly Haven and Resort in Pulilan
Angat Hydroelectric Dam in Norzagaray
C & B Orchid Farm in San Rafael	
Biak-na-Bato National Park in San Miguel		
Garden City in Guiguinto	
Bakas in Norzagaray	
Hilltop in Norzagaray
Pinagrealan Cave in Norzagaray
Grotto of Our Lady of Lourdes in San Jose del Monte City			
Puning Cave in Doña Remedios Trinidad	
Bustos Dam in Bustos
Tilapilon Hills in Doña Remedios Trinidad

See also

 List of people from Bulacan
 List of radio stations in Bulacan
 Roman Catholic Diocese of Malolos
 Malolos Cathedral

References

External links

 
 Bulacan PH
 Philippine Standard Geographic Code

 
Provinces of the Philippines
Provinces of Central Luzon